Timothy Toroitich (born 10 October 1991) is a Ugandan middle-distance and long-distance runner. He competed in the 10,000 metres event at the 2015 World Championships in Athletics in Beijing, China.

Personal bests
1500 metres: 3:46.95, Kampala, Uganda 02 June 2012
5000 metres: 13:32.21, Rabat, Morocco, 09 June 2013
10,000 metres: 27:21.09, London, Great Britain, 4 August 2017
3000 metres steeplechase: 8:23.61, Brazzaville, Congo, 10 June 2012
10 kilometres: 28:42, Birmingham, Great Britain, 30 April 2017
12 kilometres: 33:48, Cape Town, South Africa, 17 May 2015
Half marathon: 1:00:53, Lisbon, Portugal, 20 October 2019

References

External links

1991 births
Living people
Ugandan male long-distance runners
Ugandan male middle-distance runners
World Athletics Championships athletes for Uganda
Place of birth missing (living people)
Athletes (track and field) at the 2016 Summer Olympics
Olympic athletes of Uganda
Athletes (track and field) at the 2018 Commonwealth Games
Commonwealth Games competitors for Uganda
20th-century Ugandan people
21st-century Ugandan people